The Saudi Arabia national badminton team represents Saudi Arabia in international badminton team competitions and is organized by the Saudi Badminton Federation. The Saudi Arabian team started sending its players to compete internationally at the 2017 BWF World Junior Championships in Yogyakarta.

Saudi Arabia also competed in badminton at the 2018 Asian Games. They have yet to qualify or compete in a team event.

Participation in BWF competitions

BWF World Junior Championships 
Individual event

Participation in Asian Games

Individual event

Current squad 

Male players
Abdullah Al-Harthi
Abdulaziz Al-Othman
Muath Al-Ghamdi
Nawar Al-Ghamdi

Female players
Rana Abu Harbesh
Shatha Al-Mutairi

References 

Badminton
National badminton teams